The Mid-Central Conference was a short-lived IHSAA-sanctioned conference based in Northwest-Central Indiana. Formed in 1966, and based in Boone, Carroll, Clinton, and Tippecanoe counties, the conference was hit hard by the consolidation of smaller Tippecanoe County schools into Harrison and McCutcheon high schools. The consolidation of the latter left the conference with three schools, effectively ending it. The same three schools would form the Hoosier Heartland Conference 15 years later, which is another small-school conference with a similar geographic footprint.

Membership 

 Carroll and Clinton Prairie played concurrently in the HAC and MCC during the MCC's entire duration.

References

Indiana high school athletic conferences
High school sports conferences and leagues in the United States
Indiana High School Athletic Association disestablished conferences